Making up over 55% of the state's generated electricity in 2021, wind power is the largest source of electricity generation in Iowa.   In 2020, over 34 billion kWh of electrical energy was generated by wind power. As of Q3 2020, Iowa has over 10,951 megawatts (MW) of installed capacity with 5,590 wind turbines, ranking 2nd and 3rd in the nation below Texas respectively.

The development of wind power in Iowa began with a state law, enacted in 1983, requiring investor-owned utilities in the state to purchase 105 MW of power from wind generation.  Former governor Terry Branstad stated that by 2020 the percentage of wind generated electricity in Iowa could reach 40 percent. This goal has been exceeded, with over 40 percent of Iowa's electricity being generated from the wind as of October 2019 according to the Energy Information Administration, a first in the nation accomplishment.

Overview

In addition to federal programs, the state of Iowa encourages development of renewable electricity sources through a 1 cent per kilowatt hour tax credit. Also, generation equipment and facilities receive property tax breaks, and generation equipment is exempt from sales tax.

The development of wind power in Iowa began with the enactment in 1983 of a state law that required investor-owned utilities in the state to buy a total of 105 MW of power from wind generated electricity, one of the first renewable electricity portfolio standards. This provided assurance to those building wind power installations that there would be a market for the electricity they produced. 
 

In 2010 and in 2009, Iowa led the U.S. in the percentage of electrical power generated by wind, at 15.4 percent and 14.2 percent. This was up from 7.7 percent in 2008, as there was a large increase in the installed capacity in 2008. Some of the wind power generated electricity is sold to utility companies in nearby states, such as Wisconsin, and Illinois.

Wind farms are most prevalent in the north and west portion of Iowa.  Wind maps show the winds in these areas to be stronger on average, making them better suited for the development of wind energy. 
Average wind speeds are not consistent from month to month.  Wind maps show wind speeds are on average strongest from November through April, peaking in March.  August is the month with the weakest average wind speeds. On a daily cycle, there is a slight rise in average wind speeds in the afternoon, from 1 to 6 p.m. Estimates by the National Renewable Energy Laboratory (NREL) indicate Iowa has potentially 570,700 Megawatts of wind power using large turbines mounted on 80 meter towers. Iowa ranks seventh in the country in terms of wind energy generation potential due to the strong average wind speeds in the midsection of the U.S. The Iowa Environmental Mesonet distributes current weather and wind conditions from approximately 450 monitoring stations across Iowa, providing data for modelling and predicting wind power.

The average capacity factor of Iowa wind farms has been estimated as 33.3% by a wind industry consultant. For newer installations, higher capacity factors, approaching 40%, have been stated. Production numbers for 2013, when wind capacity remained almost constant, showed a capacity factor over 34 percent. Due to these better wind conditions, Iowa generated more electricity from wind power in 2013 than California, even though it had less wind power capacity installed.  And again in 2014 Iowa was number two in wind power generation behind only Texas.

Several of the newer projects are the large 500 MW Highland Wind Energy Center and the O'Brien Wind Farm in O'Brien County, and the Ida Wind farm in Ida county. These were constructed in 2015 and 2016.

According to the Iowa Office of Energy Independence, lack of transmission line capacity is beginning to restrict further growth of wind farms in the state. A report from the NREL acknowledges that this is a major hurdle to increased wind power development in the U.S. A high-voltage direct current line that would transmit power from near Sioux City to the Chicago area has been proposed.

MidAmerican Energy, in 2015, completed five projects in Iowa totaling over 1,000 MW of capacity. The projects are in O'Brien, Marshall, Webster, Grundy, and Madison counties. 448 wind turbines manufactured by Siemens are to be constructed.  At a cost of some 1.9 billion dollars, this will be Iowa's largest economic development project to date.  The largest project, the Highland Wind Energy Center in O'Brien county, has 500 MW of generation capacity, making it the state's largest.

In 2017, construction was started on the third wind farm of MidAmerican Energy's Wind XI project.  The North English Wind farm in Poweshiek County will consist of 170 2.0 MW Vestas turbines. The project is scheduled to be completed at the end of 2018. Work on two other wind farms in the project, the Beaver Creek wind farm and the Prairie wind farm, is expected to be finished the end of 2017.

From October 23 to 24, 2017, wind power provided all the power consumed by MidAmerica Energy's Iowa customers.  This was the first time wind generation reached this threshold, aided by sustained winds of 25 mph (40 km/h) with gusts to 40 mph (65 km/h).

A new transmission line is being built to transmit some of the power from the Highland project to the Spencer and Iowa Great Lakes area.  Additionally, power will be transmitted by an existing 345 kilovolt line running from south of Sioux City to Lakefield, Minnesota.

Local industry
A number of companies involved in the wind power industry have offices or manufacturing facilities in Iowa. Blades for wind turbines are manufactured in Newton by TPI Composites and in Fort Madison by Siemens. Towers are also manufactured in Newton by Arcosa, a spinoff of Trinity Structural Towers.  Companies manufacturing other parts for wind turbines are located in Iowa as well.

In addition to manufacturing, various companies support the development of wind power projects. The wind power industry employs 9,000 to 10,000 people in Iowa.
Over $16 billion  has been invested in Iowa's wind power projects and manufacturing facilities.

In late September 2007, Siemens Power Generation opened its new wind turbine blade factory in Fort Madison, on the banks of the Mississippi River. The factory can produce more than 2000 blades annually. A plant expansion in 2008 brought the facility up to nearly 600,000 square feet, up from 310,000. The facility manufactures -long, 12-ton blades for the company's 2.3-MW wind turbines installed in the United States.

The Iowa Office of Energy Independence (OEI) is tasked with determining policy and setting goals towards renewable energy production.  The office seeks to coordinate efforts between industry, community leaders, state and local government, and educational institutions to achieve energy policy goals.

Wind farms

The following lists some of the wind projects in Iowa.

The Spirit, Endeavor, Buena Vista, Lost Lakes, and Crosswind Energy wind farms are all located upon the Coteau des Prairies, a slightly elevated area that results in the windiest locations in Minnesota and Iowa. Coteau des Prairies is sometimes referred to as Buffalo Ridge, which is actually a specific ridge within the area, mostly in Minnesota.

Power from the Iowa Lakes Superior and Iowa Lakes Lakota projects is used by ethanol fuel plants in their respective communities.

Wind generation

 Teal background indicates wind was the largest source of generation that month.

 Green background indicates largest wind generation month to date.

See also

Solar power in Iowa
Rock Island Clean Line
Wind power in the United States
Renewable energy in the United States

References

External links
 Iowa Alliance for Wind Innovation and Novel Development
 Wind energy data for Iowa at The Wind Power
 Iowa Office of Energy Independence: Wind